The 2014 FIFA Club World Cup (officially known as the FIFA Club World Cup Morocco 2014 presented by Toyota for sponsorship reasons) was the 11th edition of the FIFA Club World Cup, a FIFA-organised international club football tournament between the winners of the six continental confederations as well as the host nation's league champions. It was hosted by Morocco for the second year in a row, and played from 10 to 20 December 2014.

Defending champions Bayern Munich did not qualify as they were eliminated in the semi-finals of the 2013–14 UEFA Champions League by eventual winners Real Madrid. The Spanish side went on to beat Mexico's Cruz Azul 4–0 in the Club World Cup semi-finals, before defeating San Lorenzo 2–0 in the final to give them their first Club World Cup title. Including the 1960, 1998 and 2002 Intercontinental Cups, it was Real Madrid's fourth world club title, equalling Milan's record.

Host bids
There were four countries bidding to host the 2013 and 2014 tournaments (same host for both tournaments):

 (which hosted the 2009 and 2010 editions in Abu Dhabi)

In October 2011, FIFA said that Iran, South Africa and the United Arab Emirates all withdrew their bids, leaving Morocco as the only bidder. The FIFA Executive Committee officially confirmed Morocco as host on 17 December 2011 during their meeting in Tokyo, Japan.

On 21 August 2014, FIFA issued a statement reconfirming Morocco as the host, despite recent rumours that a change in venue might be sought due to the 2014 West Africa Ebola virus outbreak. Morocco had cancelled its hosting of the 2015 Africa Cup of Nations due to fears of Ebola, but vowed to host the Club World Cup as no entrants would be from the countries with the most severe Ebola outbreaks.

Qualified teams

Venues
The venues for the 2014 FIFA Club World Cup were in Rabat and Marrakesh.

Match officials
The appointed match officials were:

Notes

Squads

Each team named a 23-man squad (three of whom must be goalkeepers) by the FIFA deadline of 28 November 2014. Injury replacements were allowed until 24 hours before the team's first match. The squads were announced by FIFA on 4 December 2014.

Matches
If a match was tied after normal playing time:
For elimination matches, extra time was played. If still tied after extra time, a penalty shoot-out was held to determine the winner.
For the matches for fifth place and third place, no extra time was played, and a penalty shoot-out was held to determine the winner.

All times are local, WET (UTC±0).

Play-off for quarter-finals

Quarter-finals
A draw was held on 11 October 2014 at 19:00 WEST (UTC+1), at the La Mamounia Hotel in Marrakesh, to determine the pairings of the four quarter-finalists.

Semi-finals
The first semi-final was originally to be played at Prince Moulay Abdellah Stadium, Rabat, but was moved to Stade de Marrakech, Marrakesh due to difficult pitch conditions.

Match for fifth place

Match for third place

Final

Goalscorers

1 own goal
 Daniel Mullen (Western Sydney Wanderers, against ES Sétif)

Awards

The following awards were given at the conclusion of the tournament.

FIFA also named a man of the match for the best player in each game at the tournament.

References

External links
FIFA Club World Cup Morocco 2014, FIFA.com
FIFA Technical Report

 
2014
FIFA Club World Cup 2014
2014 in association football
2014–15 in Spanish football
2014–15 in Moroccan football
2014 in Argentine football
2014–15 in Mexican football
2014–15 in New Zealand association football
2014–15 in Algerian football
2014 in Australian soccer
2014
2014
2014
2014